WBUV (104.9 MHz, "News Radio 104.9 FM"), is a commercial FM radio station licensed to Moss Point, Mississippi, and serving the Gulfport–Biloxi-Pascagoula radio market. The station broadcasts a talk radio format and is owned by iHeartMedia, Inc.  The studios and offices are on DeBuys Road in Biloxi.

WBUV has an effective radiated power (ERP) of 16,000 watts. The transmitter is off Mississippi State Highway 57 in Vancleave.  It shares the transmitter tower with sister station WMJY.

Programming
On weekdays, most of WBUV's programming is nationally syndicated shows.  Weekdays begin with "This Morning, America's First News with Gordon Deal," followed by Glenn Beck, "The Clay Travis and Buck Sexton Show," Sean Hannity, Jesse Kelly, Mark Levin and "Coast to Coast AM with George Noory."  

WBUV carries Southern Miss Football and New Orleans Pelicans' Basketball as well as Fox Sports Radio on weekends.  Weekend syndicated political shows include "The Weekend with Michael Brown" and "Sunday Night Live with Bill Cunningham."  Most hours begin with an update from Fox News Radio.

History
It was a country music station, WBUB, based in Mobile, Alabama. In 1998, the station was acquired by Clear Channel Communications (forerunner to today's iHeartMedia). Clear Channel moved the signal to the Biloxi-Gulfport-Pascagoula market. 

It became WBUV, which started as an urban contemporary outlet known as "V104.9."  The station played Hip Hop, R&B, and on Sundays, Urban Gospel. The station also hosted the nationally syndicated Doug Banks Morning Show and later the Russ Parr Morning Show. The station competed with WJZD  (Gulfport, Mississippi) and WBLX (Mobile, Alabama) in the Alabama/Mississippi Gulf Coast's urban contemporary market. 

Following Hurricane Katrina in 2005, the station began to broadcast 24-hour news and information to keep the community up-to-date on the storm recovery efforts.  That prompted iHeartMedia to continue the talk format even after most communities had returned to normal. The station has risen to be one of the top-ranked stations along the Coast.  

Since Hurricane Katrina, the station has undergone various talk show host changes.  Kipp Gregory left the station in 2012 and moved to FM 103.1.  He was replaced with Steve Taylor and Mike Mankiewicz. Shortly after Kipp left, the Michael Savage show, Clark Howard, and Todd Schnitt were removed from the lineup. New programs at the time were Sean Hannity and Andy Dean.  The Andy Dean Show was removed after one year in 2014 and replaced with the Joe Pags show from 5-8 pm, followed by the 8-11 pm Mark Levin show introduced during the winter of 2014-15.  Joe Pags last show on 104.9 was in July 2015 when it was replaced with the Megan McCain show. 

In August 2018, Steve Taylor and Mike Mankiewicz departed the show for the station as the local Gulfcoast Morning Show came to an end.  It replaced by Gordon Deal and America's First News. The station now has syndicated shows all day on weekdays, with local inserts of Gulf-area news and weather.

References

External links
WBUV official website

BUV
News and talk radio stations in the United States
Radio stations established in 2005
IHeartMedia radio stations